ENZK was a punk and hardcore fanzine from Scotland. 10 issues have been published to date. It was based on DIY ethics and non profit, low cost ideals.

It was written by Graham Enzk and the first issue was published in 1989. It was originally laid out using a mixture of type and handwriting within the traditional punk cut and paste style, later moving toward a cleaner DTP style. It was initially printed by the UK punk scene's most prolific and cheapest printing service, Bobprint, and sold for slightly less than the actual cost of printing them. Later issues were printed by Urban Print in Dundee.

ENZK was erratic in its output, with often several years between some issues. The paper version of the zine became too expensive to print and number 8 and 9 were just review sheets. Issue 10 saw a return to a full zine and also a compilation CD of Scottish hardcore bands.

Around 1998 the zine also made the jump to the web, again on a DIY low cost basis on free hosting Angelfire. The website contained many reviews and interviews from the out of print paper versions and also a large section of photos of punk and hardcore bands playing live. The photography gradually became the focus of the website and it currently contains nearly 2000 shots. Through 2005 and 2006 the site was updated often but nothing has been added since 15 August 2006. Graham Enzk still takes photos and several of these have appeared on the Underground Scene (UGS) website since 2006.

Issues
Issue 1 - Bolt Thrower, Paradise Lost, Rectify, Don't Kill Sheep and Active Malfuctions.
Issue 2 - Sink, Snuff, Identity, Deviated Instinct, Cowboy Killers
Issue 3 - Senseless Things, Dunderfunk, Fuse, Pluto Marys, Gan
Issue 4 - 
Issue 5 - 
Issue 7 - 
Issue 8 - 
Issue 9 - 
Issue 10 - 

Music magazines published in the United Kingdom
Defunct magazines published in Scotland
Fanzines
Magazines established in 1989
Magazines disestablished in 2006